Ahmad Ghahreman (احمد قهرمان, in Persian) (born 1928, Babol - died November 7, 2008 Tehran) was an Iranian botanist and professor of Tehran university.

References

 FLORA oF IRAN
 Biography of Dr. Ahmad Ghahreman
 Tebyan
 IRNA
 Northern Jungles Weblog 

1928 births
2008 deaths
People from Babol
Iranian Science and Culture Hall of Fame recipients in Medicine